This is a list of squares in Malta. It includes the main square in every locality of Republic of Malta situated on the islands of Malta, Gozo and Comino.

Attard

Bay Square (Wesgħat il-Plajja)
Church Square (Misraħ il-Knisja) - The main square of Attard.
John Paul II Square (Misraħ Ġwanni Pawlu II)
St. Anne Square (Pjazzetta Sant' Anna)

Balzan

Robert Fenech Square (Pjazza Bertu Fenech) - The main and only square in Balzan.
Profs. Aquilina Square (Wesgħa Profs Ġużè Aquilina)

Birgu

Mattia Preti Square (Wesgħa Mattia Preti)
St. Philip Square (Pjazzetta San Filippu)
Victory Square (Misraħ ir-Rebħa) - The main square of Birgu (Città Vittoriosa)

Birkirkara

28th February Square (Misraħ Frar 28)
Chickens Square (Misraħ it-Tiġieġ)
Carmelo Rizzo Square (Misraħ Karm Rizzo)
Joseph Briffa Square (Pjazza Joseph Briffa)
Railway Square (Pjazza tal-Ferrovija)
St. Alyosius Square (Misraħ San Alwiġi)
St. Frances Square (Pjazza San Franġisk)
St. Helen Square (Pjazza Sant' Elena) - The main square of Birkirkara.

Swatar

Hero Square (Pjazza l-Eroj) - The main square of Swatar, hamlet in Birkirkara.

Birżebbuġa

Carmelo Caruana Square (Wesgħa Carmelo Caruana)
Church Square (Misraħ il-Knisja) - The main square of Birżebbuġa.
Hamilkar Barka Square (Misraħ Ħamilkar Barka)
Republic Square (Misraħ ir-Repubblika)
Sacred Heart's Square (Misraħ tal-Qalb Imqaddsa)
Summit Square (Misraħ is-Summit)
Ta' Pajtier Square (Misraħ Ta' Pajtier)

Qajjenza

Ramon Perellos Square - The main square of Qajjenza, not official hamlet in Birżebbuġa.

Bormla

Bonnici Square (Misraħ Bonnici)
Church of Nativity Square (Wesgħa l-Knisja tan-Nattività)
Cospicua Square (Misraħ Bormla)
Gavino Gulia Square (Misraħ Gavino Gulia) - The main square of Bormla (Città Cospicua).
Paolino Vassallo Square (Pjazza Paolino Vassallo)
St. Margret Square (Misraħ Santa Margerita)
St. Theresa Square (Pjazza Santa Tereża)

Dingli

Frances Abela Square (Misraħ Frenċ Abela) - The main square of Dingli.
Ġużè Abela Square (Misraħ Ġużè Abela)
Monument Square (Misraħ il-Mafkar)
Psaigon Square (Wesgħa Psaigon)

Fgura

Bro. R. Gauci Square (Pjazza Patri Redent Gauci)
Council of Europe Square (Wesgħet il-Kunsill tal-Ewropa)
Joseph Gauci Square (Wesgħet Ġużeppi Gauci)
Reggie Miller Square (Wesgħa Reggie Miller) - The main square of Fgura.

Floriana, Malta

E.S. Tonna Square (Pjazza Emanuel S. Tonna)
Filippo Sceberras Square (Pjazza Filippo Sceberras)
Graneries Square (Pjazza tal-Fosos) - This also known as the Small Graneries Square (Il-Fosos iż-Żgħar), to not confuse it with St. Publius Square.
Pope John XXIII Square (Pjazza Papa Giovanni XXIII)
Robert Samut Square (Pjazza Robert Samut)
Sir Luigi Preziosi Square (Pjazza Sir Luigi Preziosi)
St. Anne Square (Pjazza Sant' Anna)
St. Calcidonio Square (Pjazza San Kalċidonju)
St. Publius Square (Misraħ San Publju) - The main square of Floriana and the largest square in Malta. This square is also known as Fuq il-Fosos (The Graneries).

Gudja

Angelo Dalli Square (Wesgħet Anġlu Dalli)
Church's Square (Pjazza tal-Knisja) - the main square of Gudja.

Gżira

De La Salle Square (Pjazza De La Salle)
Memè Scicluna Square (Pjazza Memè Scicluna) - The main square of Gżira.
Turo Colombo Square (Misraħ Turu Colombo)

Għargħur

Church Square (Misraħ il-Knisja) - The main and only square in Għargħur.

Għaxaq

Bir id-Deheb Square (Wesgħa Ta' Bir id-Deheb) - The main square of Bir id-Deheb, not official hamlet between Żejtun and Għaxaq.
St. George Square (Misraħ San Ġorġ)
St. Mary Square (Pjazza Santa Marija) - The main square of Għaxaq.
St. Philip Square (Misraħ San Filippu)
St. Roque Square (Misraħ Santu Rokku) - The largest square in Għaxaq.

Ħamrun

7th June, 1919 Square (Misraħ is-Sebgħa ta' Ġunju, 1919)
Hamrun Victims Square (Misraħ il-Vittmi Ħamruniżi)
Parish Priest Muscat (Pjazza Kappillan Muscat) - The main square of Ħamrun's Immaculate Conception Parish.
St. Paul Square (Pjazza San Pawl) - The main square of Ħamrun, it is also known as Fra Diego Square (Pjazza Fra Diegu).

Iklin

L.J.B. Scicluna Square (Wesgħa Lewis J.B. Scicluna)
Cremona Square (Pjazza Ninu Cremona) - the main square of Iklin

Kalkara

Archbishop Gonzi Square (Misraħ l-Arċisqof Gonzi) - The main square of Kalkara.
Holy Family Square (Pjazza Sagra Familja)

Kirkop

Kirkop Square (Misraħ Ħal Kirkop)
St. Leonard Square (Misraħ San Anard) - The main square of Kirkop.
Sunrise Square (Misraħ iż-Żerniq)

Lija

Transfiguration Square (Misraħ it-Trasfigurazzjoni) - The main and only square in Lija.

Luqa

Church Square (Misraħ tal-Knisja)
Rev. Joe M. Camilleri Square (Wesgħet Dun Joe M. Camilleri)
St. Andrews' Square (Misraħ Sant' Andrija) - The main square of Luqa.
War Victims Square (Wesgħet il-Vittmi tal-Gwerra) - The largest square in Luqa.
Youths Square (Misraħ iż-Żgħażagħ)

Marsa, Malta

Bro. Magri Square (Misraħ Patri Magri)
G.F. Abela Square (Misraħ Giovanni F. Abela)

Marsaskala

Lorry Sant Square (Pjazza Lorry Sant)
Mifsud Bonnici Square (Misraħ Mifsud Bonnici) - the main playground and park of Marsaskala
Rev. Tarcisio Agius Square (Pjazza Dun Tarċis Agius) - the main square of Marsaskala

Marsaxlokk

Our Lady of Pompeii Square (Pjazza l-Madonna ta' Pompej) - the main square of Marsaxlokk
Rev. Joseph Caruana Square (Wesgħa Dun Ġużepp Caruana)

Mdina

Bastion's Square (Pjazza tas-Sur)
Blessed Maria Adeodata Pisani Square (Pjazzetta Beata Marija Adeodata Pisani)
Council Square (Misraħ il-Kunsill)
Greek's Gate Square (Misraħ tal-Mina tal-Griegi)
Mesquita Square (Misraħ Mesquita)
St. Agatha's Square (Wesgħa ta' Sant' Agata)
St. Paul's Square (Misraħ San Pawl) - the main square of Mdina.
St. Publius Square (Misraħ San Publju)

Mellieħa

Cross Square (Misraħ Tas-Salib) - The main square of Tas-Salib area.
Narcis Square (Wesgħat in-Narċis)
Parish Square (Misraħ il-Parroċċa) - The main square of Mellieħa.
Pope Visit Square (Misraħ iż-Żjara tal-Papa)
Thomas Spratt Square (Pjazza Thomas Spratt)

Manikata

Bay Square - The main square of Għajn Tuffieħa area, part of the non official hamlet of Manikata.

Mġarr

Jubilee Square (Wesgħat il-Ġublew) - The main square of Mgarr.

Mosta

16th September Square (Pjazza s-Sittax ta' Settembru)
Brittany Square (Misraħ Brittanja)
Flower Square (Wesgħet il-Plejju)
Għonoq Square (Misraħ il-Għonoq)
Marco Montebello Square (Wesgħet Marco Montebello)
Rotunda Square (Pjazza tar-Rotunda) - The main square of Mosta.
St. Leonard Square (Pjazza San Leonardu)

Mqabba

Church's Square (Pjazza tal-Knisja)
Diamond Jubilee Square (Pjazza tal-Ġublew tad-Djamanti)
Fidwa Square (Misraħ il-Fidwa)
Little Mission Square (Misraħ il-Missjoni ż-Żgħira)

Msida

G. Debono Square (Misraħ G. Debono)
G. Ellul Mercer Square (Misraħ Ġużè Ellul Mercer)
Menqa Square (Misraħ il-Menqa) - the main square of Msida.
St. Joseph Square (Misraħ San Ġużepp)

Mtarfa

Frezia Square (Wesgħat il-Freżja)
Sunflower Square (Misraħ il-Warda tax-Xemx)
Water Supplies Square (Wesgħat il-Ħażniet tal-Ilma)

Naxxar

Chelsea Square (Pjazza Ċelsi)
Darnino Square (Pjazza Darnino)
St. Paul Square (Misraħ San Pawl)
Toni Bajjada Square (Pjazza Toni Bajjada)
Victory Square (Pjazza Vittorja) - The main square of Naxxar.

Paola

Grand Master Antoine De Paule Square (Pjazza Antoine De Paule) - Paola's Main Square
Saint Ubaldesca Square (Pjazza Santa Ubaldeska)
St. Anthony's Square (Pjazza Sant' Antnin) - the main square of the hamlet of Għajn Dwieli

Pembroke, Malta

Fort Pembroke Square (Misraħ il-Forti Pembroke)
Shelter Square (Wesgħat ix-Xelter)

Pieta, Malta

Our Lady of Fatima Square (Pjazza Madonna ta' Fatima)
Mgr. Isidoro Formosa Square (Pjazza Mons. Isidoro Formosa) - a square in Guardamangia
St. Lukes' Square (Pjazza San Luqa) - the main bus terminus of St. Luke's Hospital

Rabat, Malta

Forok Square (Misraħ il-Forok)
L'Isle Adam Square (Pjazza L'Isle Adam)
Museum Square (Wesgħa Tal-Mużew) - The largest square in Rabat.
Parish Square (Misraħ il-Parroċċa) - The main square of Rabat.
Saqqajja Square (Pjazza tas-Saqqajja)
St. Domenic Square (Misraħ San Duminku)

Baħrija

Bro. Martin Caruana Square (Misraħ Patri Martin Caruana, O.P.) - The main and only square of Baħrija, an official hamlet of Rabat.

Qormi

15th March Square (Misraħ il-15 ta' Marzu)
Authors Square (Misraħ il-Kittieba)
Federico Maempel Square (Pjazza Federico Maempel)
Garden Square (Pjazza tal-Ġnien)
Grand Master Square (Pjazza tal-Gran Mastru)
Ġużè Flores Square (Misraħ Ġużè Flores)
Maltese Folk Music Square (Misraħ l-Għana)
Mgr. P.P. Psaila Square (Pjazza Mons. P.P. Psaila)
Narbona Square (Pjazza Narbona)
Olives Square (Misraħ iż-Żebbuġ)
St. Frances Square (Pjazza San Franġisk)
St. Mary's Square (Pjazza Santa Marija)

Qrendi

Maqluba Square (Misraħ tal-Maqluba)
Sanctuary of Our Lady of Mercy Square (Misrah is-Santwarju tal-Madonna tal-Hniena) - The main square of Tal-Hniena area.
St. Mary Square (Misraħ Santa Marija)
St. Matthew Square (Misraħ San Mattew)  - The main square of Maqluba area.
Parish Square (Pjazza Parrokjali]] - The main square of Qrendi.

Safi, Malta

Church Square (Misraħ il-Knisja) - The main square of Safi.
St. Joseph Square (Misraħ San Ġużepp)
St. Matthew Square (Misraħ San Mattew)

San Ġiljan

Agostino Savelli Square (Wesgħa Agostino Savelli)
Balluta Square (Pjazza Balluta) - The main square of Balluta Bay.
Tanti Square (Wesgħat Ġużè Tanti)

San Ġwann

Awrekarja Square (Misraħ Awrekarja)
Centwarja Square (Misraħ Ċentwarja)
Almond's Square (Misraħ Lewża)
Lourdes Square (Misraħ Lourdes)
V. Borg Square (Pjazza Vincenzo Borg - Brared)

San Pawl il-Baħar

Bay Square (Misraħ il-Bajja) - The main square of Bugibba.
Sheltered Square (Wesgħa l-Kennija) - Qawra

Santa Luċija

7th July, 1961 Square (Pjazza 7 ta' Lulju, 1961)
Dorell Square (Misraħ Dorell) - The main square of Santa Luċija

Santa Venera

St. Venera Square (Misraħ Santa Venera)

Senglea (L-Isla)

4th September Square (Misraħ l-Erbgħa ta' Settembru)
Andrea Debono Square (Misraħ Andrea Debono)
Dom Mauro Inguanez Square (Misraħ Dom Mawru Inguanez)
Francesco Zahra Square (Pjazza Francesco Zahra)
George Mitrovich Square (Misraħ Ġorġ Mitrovich)
Pope Benedict XV Square (Misraħ il-Papa Benedittu XV)- the main square of Senglea

Siġġiewi

Città Ferdinand Square (Pjazza Città Ferdinand)
Palace Square (Wesgħet il-Palazz)
St. John Square (Pjazza San Ġwann)
St. Nicholas Square (Pjazza San Nikola) - The main square of Siġġiewi.
War Victims Square (Misraħ il-Vittmi tal-Gwerra)

Sliema

Annunciation Square (Pjazza tal-Lunzjata)
Dingli Circle (Pjazza Sir Adrian Dingli)
St. Anne's Square (Pjazza Sant' Anna) - the main square of Sliema.

Tarxien

Agatha Barbara Square (Pjazza Agatha Barbara)
Buleben Square (Misraħ Buleben)
Market Square (Misraħ tas-Suq)
Republic Square (Misraħ ir-Repubblika) - The main square of Tarxien.

Valletta

Castile Place (Misraħ Kastilja)
Freedom Square (Misraħ il-Ħelsien) - The square was decreased in footprint and part of it is now occupied by the Parliament House of Malta
Independence Square (Misraħ Indipendenza)
Mattia Preti Square (Misraħ Mattia Preti) - The main square of Marsamxett area.
Republic Square (Misraħ ir-Repubblika) - This square is known also as Queen's Square (Pjazza Reġina)
St. Elmo Place (Misraħ Sant' Iermu)
St. George's Square (Misraħ San Ġorġ) - The main square of Valletta, it is also known as Palace Square (Misraħ il-Palazz)
St. John's Square (Misraħ San Ġwann)
Victory Square (Misraħ il-Vittorja)

Xgħajra

Freedom Square (Wesgħet il-Ħelsien) - The only square in Xgħajra.

Żabbar

Our Lady Mediatrice Square (Misraħ il-Madonna Medjatriċi) - The main square of Żabbar.
Maltese Heros Square (Misraħ il-Qalbiena Maltin) - The main square of Buleben iż-Żgħir, not official hamlet in Żabbar.
Peace Square (Misraħ is-Sliem)
St. James Square (Misraħ San Ġakbu)
St. Nicholas Square (Misraħ San Nikola)
Wignacourt Square (Misraħ Alofju Wignacourt)

Żebbuġ, Malta

Hal Dwieli Square (Misraħ Ħal-Dwieli)
Hospital Square (Misraħ l-Isptar)
Muxi Square (Misraħ Muxi) - The main square of Ħal Muxi, not official hamlet in Żebbuġ.
St. Philip Square (Misraħ San Filippu) - The main square of Żebbuġ.

Żejtun

5th October, 1974 Square (Wesgħat l-5 ta' Ottubru, 1974)
13th December Square (Misraħ Diċembru Tlettax)
Animals' Spring Square (Wesgħat l-Għajn tal-Bhejjem)
Bandolier Square (Misraħ il-Bandolier)
Canon Giovanni Vella (Misraħ il-Kanonku Giovanni Vella)
Carlo Diacono (Misraħ Karlu Diacono)
Carmelo Grima (Misraħ Karmnu Grima)
Engineers Square (Wesgħat l-Inġiniera)
George Busuttil Square (Misraħ Ġorġ Busuttil)
Giuseppe Pulis Montebello Square (Wesgħat Giuseppe Pulis Montebello)
Gregorio Bonici Square (Misraħ Girgor Bonici)
Independence Square (Misraħ l-Indipendenza)
M.A. Vassalli Square (Misraħ Mikiel Anton Vassalli)
Republic Square (Misraħ ir-Repubblika)
St. Mary's Square (Misraħ Santa Marija)
Ta' Pizzuta Square (Misraħ Ta' Pizzuta)
Wells' Square (Misraħ il-Bjar)

Żurrieq

Carmelites Square (Misraħ il-Karmelitani)
Francesco Bugeja Square (Wesgħa Franġisk Bugeja)
Joseph M. Cassar Square (Wesgħat Joseph M. Cassar)
Mattia Preti Square (Misraħ Mattia Preti)
Republic Square (Misraħ ir-Repubblika)
St. Lazzarus Square (Misraħ San Lażżru)

Bubaqra

St. Mary Square (Misraħ Santa Marija)

Gozo

Fontana, Malta

Springs Square (Misraħ l-Għejjun) - The main and only square in Fontana, it is also known as Fontana Square.

Għajnsielem

10th December Square (Pjazzetta Għaxra ta' Diċembru)
Appiration Square (Pjazza tad-Dehra)
Independence Square (Għajnsielem) (Pjazza Indipendenza)
Our Lady of Loreto Square (Pjazza Madonna ta' Loreto)
Tolfa Square (Pjazza Tolfa)

Għarb

Gerano Square (Pjazza Gerano)
Prague Square (Pjazza Praga)
Visitation of Our Lady Square (Pjazza taż-Żjara tal-Madonna)

Għasri

Rev. Joseph Buttigieg Square (Wesgħa Dun Ġużepp Buttigieg)
Our Saviour Square (Pjazza s-Salvatur)

Kerċem

Orvieto Square (Pjazza Orvieto)
Salvatore Busuttil Square (Pjazza Salvatore Busuttil)
St. Gregory Square (Pjazza San Girgor)
St. Lucia Square (Pjazza Santa Luċija) - The main square of the hamlet of Santa Luċija, Gozo.

Munxar

Anfori Square (Pjazza l-Anfori) - The main square of Xlendi, an official hamlet of Munxar.
Church Square (Pjazza tal-Knisja) - The main square of Munxar.

Nadur

28th April, 1688 Square (Pjazza t-Tmienja u Għoxrin ta' April, 1688)
Archpriest Martin Camilleri Square (Pjazza l-Arċipriet Martin Camilleri)
St. Peter and St. Paul Square (Pjazza San Pietru u San Pawl) - The main square of Nadur.

Qala

Bishop Michael Buttigieg Square (Pjazza l-Isqof Mikiel Buttigieg)
Republic Square (Pjazza Repubblika)
San Kerrew Square (Pjazza San Kerrew)
St. Joseph Square (Pjazza San Ġużepp) - The main square of Qala.

San Lawrenz

Dwejra Square (Pjazza tad-Dwejra) - The main square of Dwejra.
St. Lawrence Square (Pjazza San Lawrenz) - The main square of San Lawrenz.

Sannat

St. Margareth Square (Pjazza Santa Margarita)

Victoria, Malta

Bro. A. Xerri Square (Pjazzetta Patri Akkursju Xerri)
Cathedral Square (Pjazza Katidral) - The main square of the Citadella (Gozo) fortification city in Victoria.
Gozo Siege Square (Pjazza l-Assedju ta' Għawdex)
Independence Square (Pjazza l-Indipendenza) - The main square of Victoria, it is also known as It-Tokk.
President J.F. Kennedy Square (Pjazza President J.F. Kennedy)
San Ġorġ tal-Ħaġar Square (Pjazza San Ġorġ tal-Ħaġar)
Savina Square (Pjazza Savina)
St. Augustine Square (Pjazza Santu Wistin)
St. Frances Square (Pjazza San Franġisk)
St. George Square (Pjazza San Ġorġ)
Tomba Square (Pjazzetta Fuq it-Tomba)

Xagħra

St. Anton Square (Pjazza Sant' Anton)
Victory Square (Pjazza Vittorja) - The main square of Xagħra.

Xewkija

St. John the Baptist Square (Pjazza San Ġwann Battista) - The main square of Xewkija.
Tal-Barmil Square (Pjazza Tal-Barmil)

Żebbuġ, Gozo

Assumption Square (Pjazza l-Assunta) - The main square of Żebbuġ, Gozo.
Church Square (Misraħ il-Knisja) - The main square of Marsalforn, an official hamlet of Żebbuġ, Gozo.
M. Refalo Square (Pjazza Mikelanġelo Refalo) - A square in Marsalforn.
St. Mary of Virtues Square (Pjazza Santa Marija tal-Virtù)
St. Paul Square (Pjazza San Pawl) - A square in Marsalforn.

Comino

Liberty Square (Pjazza Libertà)

References